Ghetto Street Pharmacist is a solo album by DJ U-Neek, released in 1999. Krayzie Bone, Layzie Bone & Bizzy Bone (of Bone Thugs-N-Harmony), Dresta Tha Gangsta, Doggy's Angels, and Big Lurch make appearances on the album.

Critical reception
AllMusic wrote that "like many albums by producers, it showcases style over content, trying a few too many things at once."

Track listing
 Ghetto Street Pharmacy - (Intro)
On the Run (featuring Dresta The Gangsta and Cold 187um)
 We Come To Serve 'Em (featuring The Kingpin Family)
 California Streets (featuring L-Jay)
 Bring It On (featuring Jagg)
 Now That I'm Over You (featuring Gemini)
 Woe Is I (featuring Dekumpozed)
 Real Ones, The (featuring Big Lurch & Big Bone)
 Blaze (featuring E.W.F. & Sneek)
 Doctor, Doctor (featuring Gemini & Bizzy Bone)
 Murda Murda (featuring Layzie Bone, Lethol & L-Jay)
 Ain't No Love (featuring Doggy's Angels & Allfrumtha I)
 What Must I Do (featuring Jaz & NytOwl)
 On Deck (featuring NytOwl)
 Eastsider (featuring Maneski)
 I Want Cha Lovin' (featuring Lei Callaway, Topp Notch & E.W.F.)
 Keep Servin' Em (featuring The KingPin Family)
 Hard (featuring Virgil (V-Mix) Davis Jr., Tamera Reed)
 We Come To Serve 'Em (Remix) (featuring The Kingpin Family, Krayzie Bone, Gemini, E.W.F., NytOwl & L-J)

References

DJ U-Neek albums
1999 albums